The McGees Mills Covered Bridge is a historic Burr truss wooden covered bridge located near Mahaffey, Clearfield County, Pennsylvania, United States.  It is a 109-feet bridge built in 1873 over the West Branch of the Susquehanna River.

It was listed on the National Register of Historic Places in 1988.

See also 
 National Register of Historic Places listings in Clearfield County, Pennsylvania

References 

Covered bridges on the National Register of Historic Places in Pennsylvania
Covered bridges in Clearfield County, Pennsylvania
Bridges completed in 1873
Wooden bridges in Pennsylvania
Transportation buildings and structures in Clearfield County, Pennsylvania
Tourist attractions in Clearfield County, Pennsylvania
National Register of Historic Places in Clearfield County, Pennsylvania
Road bridges on the National Register of Historic Places in Pennsylvania
Burr Truss bridges in the United States